Command to Charge is the seventh studio album by the German melodic death metal band Suidakra.

Track listing 
 "Decibel Dance" - 4:15
 "C14_Measured by Infinity" - 5:17
 "Haughs of Cromdale" - 0:29
 "The Alliance" - 4:15
 "A Runic Rhyme" - 1:49
 "Second Skin" - 4:50
 "Reap the Storm" - 4:26
 "Gathered in Fear" - 4:34
 "Strange Perfection" - 5:26
 "Dead Man's Reel (instrumental)" - 4:17 
 "The End Beyond Me" - 3:42

Personnel 
 Arkadius Antonik – lead, rhythm, melodic, acoustic guitars & main vocals
 Marcel Schoenen – melodic, acoustic guitars & clean vocals
 Marcus Riewaldt- bass
 Lars Wehner – drums & percussion
 Martin Buchwalter – engineering & mastering
 Mike Bohatch - covert art
 Nils Bross - Suidakra logo

References

External links 
 Track list and lyrics on suidakra.com

2005 albums
Suidakra albums